Biru may refer to:
 Birú, an archaic variant spelling for Perú (also: Virú, Pelú and Berú)
 biru, a Japanese high-rise or airport terminal, e.g., the Yoyogi Building
 bīru: beer in Japan
 Biru (township), township in Tibet
 Biru County, county in Tibet
 Biru, Ethiopia
 Biru, Er. biru persuaded b.e from birla institute of technology mesra ranchi